This is a list of the largest trading partners of Canada.  Canada is considered to be a trading nation

Historically, the issue of Canada's largest trade partners, and dependence on particular markets, has been a major political issue. At the time of Confederation in 1867, the United Kingdom was by far Canada's largest trading partner, reflecting the close historical, cultural, and institutional ties within the British Empire.  Over time, more and more of Canada's trade was proportionally done with the United States.  Various governments hoped to strengthen or reverse this trend, by changing tariff policy either to one of Imperial Preference with the British, Reciprocity with the National Policy of internal development.  The 1891 and 1911 elections were fought partly over the issue of closer trade relationships with the British.  Following their Civil War, the United States emerged as Canada's largest trading partner.  By the time the United Kingdom joined the European Economic Community in 1973, the idea of the UK as an alternative to the USA as Canada's largest market was no longer viable.  Canada and the United States signed the Free Trade Agreement in 1988 (which was expanded into NAFTA by the addition of Mexico in 1994).  Since that time the United States has dominated Canadian trade by an overwhelming degree. After the Wars, trade with Asia began to expand, especially China. After the opening of Canada–People's Republic of China relations in 1970, trade with China has expanded rapidly.

The 20 largest trade partners of Canada represent 94.0% of Canada's exports, and 91.9% of Canada's imports . These figures do not include services or foreign direct investment.

The largest partners of Canada with their total trade (sum of imports and exports) in millions of Canadian Dollars for calendar year 2019 are as follows:

See also
List of the largest trading partners of Australia
List of the largest trading partners of the ASEAN
List of the largest trading partners of China
List of the largest trading partners of the European Union
List of the largest trading partners of Germany
List of the largest trading partners of Italy
List of the largest trading partners of the Netherlands
List of the largest trading partners of India
List of the largest trading partners of Russia
List of the largest trading partners of United Kingdom
List of the largest trading partners of the United States

References

Foreign trade of Canada
Trading partners
Canada economy-related lists
Lists of trading partners